Raymond Goussot (31 March 1922 – 16 July 2015) was a French racing cyclist. He rode in the 1948 Tour de France. He also finished in fourth place in the 1944 Paris–Roubaix.

References

External links
 

1922 births
2015 deaths
French male cyclists
People from Clamart
Cyclists from Île-de-France
Sportspeople from Hauts-de-Seine